Emanuel School Boat Club is a rowing club on the River Thames, based at Dukes Meadows, Chiswick, London.

History
The club belongs to Emanuel School and has 70 boats and a rowing tank for training at their boathouse. The club was the dominant force in schoolboy rowing during the 1960s, a period in which it won the Schools' Head of the River Race an unprecedented eight times in nine years. In total it has won the Schools' Head 11 times (behind only the 14 of Eton College) and won the prestigious Princess Elizabeth Challenge Cup at the Henley Regatta in 1966, finishing runner-up on three further occasions. It has also produced multiple British champions.

Honours

Henley Royal Regatta

Schools' Head of the River Race

British champions

See also
Rowing on the River Thames

References

Tideway Rowing clubs
Sport in the London Borough of Hounslow
Rowing clubs in England
Rowing clubs of the River Thames
Scholastic rowing in the United Kingdom